Dixon H. Boardman (March 26, 1880 in Nutley, New Jersey – October 15, 1954 in Beverly Hills, California) was an American track and field athlete who competed at the 1900 Summer Olympics in Paris, France.

Boardman competed in the 100 metres event, placing 12th or 13th overall. He finished second in his preliminary quarterfinal heat to advance to the semifinals, but there placed fourth in his heat to be eliminated.

Boardman also competed in the 400 metres, finishing in a tie for fourth place. He finished second in his semifinal (first-round) heat to qualify for the final, but was one of three Americans who refused to take part in the final because it was held on a Sunday.

References

External links

 De Wael, Herman. Herman's Full Olympians: "Athletics 1900". Accessed 18 March 2006.
 

1880 births
1954 deaths
Athletes (track and field) at the 1900 Summer Olympics
Olympic track and field athletes of the United States
American male sprinters
People from Nutley, New Jersey
Sportspeople from Essex County, New Jersey